STM32 is a family of 32-bit microcontroller integrated circuits by STMicroelectronics. The STM32 chips are grouped into related series that are based around the same 32-bit ARM processor core: Cortex-M0, Cortex-M0+, Cortex-M3, Cortex-M4, Cortex-M7, Cortex-M33. Internally, each microcontroller consists of ARM processor core(s), flash memory, static RAM, debugging interface, and various peripherals.

Overview

The STM32 is a family of microcontroller ICs based on various 32-bit RISC ARM ARM Cortex-M cores. STMicroelectronics licenses the ARM Processor IP from ARM Holdings. The ARM core designs have numerous configurable options, and ST chooses the individual configuration to use for each design. ST attaches its own peripherals to the core before converting the design into a silicon die. The following tables summarize the STM32 microcontroller families.
{| class="wikitable"
|-
! STM32 series !! ARM CPU core(s)
|-
|  F0 || Cortex-M0
|-
|  C0, G0, L0|| Cortex-M0+
|-
|  F1, F2, L1|| Cortex-M3
|-
|  F3, F4, G4, L4, L4+ || Cortex-M4
|-
|  WB, WL || M4 & M0+ (2 core)
|-
|  F7 || Cortex-M7
|-
|  H7 || M7 (1 core), M7 & M4 (2 core)
|-
|  H5, L5, U5, WBA ||  Cortex-M33
|}

History

The STM32 is the third ARM family by STMicroelectronics. It follows their earlier STR9 family based on the ARM9E core, and STR7 family based on the ARM7TDMI core. The following is the history of how the STM32 family has evolved.

 In October 2006, STMicroelectronics (ST) announced that it licensed the ARM Cortex-M3 core.
 In June 2007, ST announced the STM32 F1-series based on the ARM Cortex-M3.
 In November 2007, ST announced the low-cost "STM32-PerformanceStick" development kit in partner with Hitex.
 In October 2009, ST announced that new ARM chips would be built using the 90 nm process.
 In April 2010, ST announced the STM32 L1-series chips.
 In September 2010, ST announced the STM32VLDISCOVERY board.
 In November 2010, ST announced the STM32 F2-series chips based on the ARM Cortex-M3 core, and future development of chips based on the ARM Cortex-M4 and ARM Cortex-M3 cores.
 In February 2011, ST announced the STM32L-DISCOVERY board.
 In March 2011, ST announced the expansion of their STM32 L1-series chips with flash densities of 256 KB and 384 KB.
 In September 2011, ST announced the STM32 F4-series chips based on the ARM Cortex-M4F core and STM32F4DISCOVERY board.
 In February 2012, ST announced the STM32 F0-series chips based on the ARM Cortex-M0 core.
 In May 2012, ST announced the STM32F0DISCOVERY board.
 In June 2012, ST announced the STM32 F3-series chips based on the ARM Cortex-M4F core.
 In September 2012, ST announced full-production of STM32 F3-series chips and STM32F3DISCOVERY board. The STM32 F050-series will also be available in a TSSOP20 package.
 In January 2013, ST announced full Java support for STM32 F2 and F4-series chips.
 In February 2013, ST announced STM32 Embedded Coder support for MATLAB and Simulink.
 In February 2013, ST announced the STM32 F4x9-series chips.
 In April 2013, ST announced the STM32 F401-series chips.
 In July 2013, ST announced the STM32 F030-series chips. The STM32 F030-series will also be available in a TSSOP20 package.
 In September 2013, ST announced the STM32F401C-DISCO and STM32F429I-DISCO boards.
 In October 2013, ST announced the STM32F0308DISCOVERY board.
 In December 2013, ST announced that it is joining the mbed project.
 In January 2014, ST announced the STM32 F0x2-series chips, STM32F072B-DISCO board, and STM32072B-EVAL board.
 In February 2014, ST announced the STM32 L0-series chips based on the ARM Cortex-M0+ core.
 In February 2014, ST announced multiple STM32 Nucleo boards with Arduino headers and mbed IDE.
 In February 2014, ST announced the release of free STM32Cube software tool with graphical configurator and C code generator.
 In April 2014, ST announced the STM32F30x chips are now available in full production. A new NUCLEO-F302R8 board was also announced.
 In September 2014, ST announced the STM32 F7 series, the first chips based on the Cortex-M7F core.
 In October 2016, ST announced the STM32H7 series based on the ARM Cortex-M7F core. The device runs at 400 MHz and is produced using 40 nm technology.
 In November 2017, ST announced the STM32L4+ series, an upgrade to the STM32L4 series Cortex-M4 MCUs.
 In October 2018, ST announced the STM32L5 series, ultra-low-power MCUs based on the ARM Cortex-M33 core with a variety of security features, such as TrustZone, Secure Boot, active IO tamper detection, Secure Firmware Install loader, certified cryptolib etc.
 In February 2021, ST announced the STM32U5 series, ultra-low-power MCUs based on the ARM Cortex-M33 core with a variety of low power and security features, such as TrustZone, Secure Boot, active IO tamper detection, hardware-based protection targeting PSA and SESIP assurance level 3, etc.

Series
The STM32 family consists of many series of microcontrollers: C0, F0, F1, F2, F3, F4, F7, G0, G4, H5, H7, L0, L1, L4, L4+, L5, U5, WBA, WB, WL.  Each STM32 microcontroller series is based upon a specific ARM Cortex-M processor core.

STM32 F0

The STM32 F0-series are the first group of ARM Cortex-M0 chips in the STM32 family. The summary for this series is:
 Core:
 ARM Cortex-M0 core at a maximum clock rate of 48 MHz.
 Cortex-M0 options include the SysTick Timer.
 Memory:
 Static RAM consists of 4 / 6 / 8 / 16 / 32 KB general purpose with hardware parity checking.
 Flash consists of 16 / 32 / 64 / 128 / 256 KB general purpose.
 Each chip has a factory-programmed 96-bit unique device identifier number. (except STM32F030x4/6/8/C and STM32F070x6/B,)
 Peripherals:
 Each F0-series includes various peripherals that vary from line to line.
 Oscillators consists of internal (8 MHz, 40 kHz), optional external (1 to 32 MHz, 32.768 to 1000 kHz).
 IC packages: TSSOP20, UFQFPN32, LQFP/UFQFN48, LQFP64, LQFP/UFBGA100.
 Operating voltage range is 2.0 to 3.6 volt with the possibility to go down to 1.65 V.

STM32 F1

The STM32 F1-series was the first group of STM32 microcontrollers based on the ARM Cortex-M3 core and considered their mainstream ARM microcontrollers. The F1-series has evolved over time by increasing CPU speed, size of internal memory, variety of peripherals. There are five F1 lines: Connectivity (STM32F105/107), Performance (STM32F103), USB Access (STM32F102), Access (STM32F101), Value (STM32F100). The summary for this series is:
 Core:
 ARM Cortex-M3 core at a maximum clock rate of 24 / 36 / 48 / 72 MHz.
 Memory:
 Static RAM consists of 4 / 6 / 8 / 10 / 16 / 20 / 24 / 32 / 48 / 64 / 80 / 96 KB.
 Flash consists of 16 / 32 / 64 / 128 / 256 / 384 / 512 / 768 / 1024 KB.
 Peripherals:
 Each F1-series includes various peripherals that vary from line to line.
 IC packages: VFQFPN36, VFQFPN48, LQFP48, WLCSP64, TFBGA64, LQFP64, LQFP100, LFBGA100, LQFP144, LFBGA144.

STM32 F2

The STM32 F2-series of STM32 microcontrollers based on the ARM Cortex-M3 core. It is the most recent and fastest Cortex-M3 series. The F2 is pin-to-pin compatible with the STM32 F4-series. The summary for this series is:
 Core:
 ARM Cortex-M3 core at a maximum clock rate of 120 MHz.
 Memory:
 Static RAM consists of 64 / 96 / 128 KB general purpose, 4 KB battery-backed, 80 bytes battery-backed with tamper-detection erase.
 Flash consists of 128 / 256 / 512 / 768 / 1024 KB general purpose, 30 KB system boot, 512 bytes one-time programmable (OTP), 16 option bytes.
 Each chip has a factory-programmed 96-bit unique device identifier number.
 Peripherals:
 Common peripherals included in all IC packages are USB 2.0 OTG HS, two CAN 2.0B, one SPI + two SPI or I²S, three I²C, four USART, two UART, SDIO/MMC, twelve 16-bit timers, two 32-bit timers, two watchdog timers, temperature sensor, 16 or 24 channels into three ADCs, two DACs, 51 to 140 GPIOs, sixteen DMA, real-time clock (RTC), cyclic redundancy check (CRC) engine, random number generator (RNG) engine. Larger IC packages add 8/16-bit external memory bus capabilities.
 The STM32F2x7 models add Ethernet MAC, camera interface, USB 2.0 OTG FS.
 The STM32F21x models add a cryptographic processor for DES / TDES / AES, and a hash processor for SHA-1 and MD5.
 Oscillators consists of internal (16 MHz, 32 kHz), optional external (4 to 26 MHz, 32.768 to 1000 kHz).
 IC packages: WLCSP64, LQFP64, LQFP100, LQFP144, LQFP176, UFBGA176.
 Operating voltage range is 1.8 to 3.6 volt.

STM32 F3

The STM32 F3-series is the second group of STM32 microcontrollers based on the ARM Cortex-M4F core. The F3 is almost pin-to-pin compatible with the STM32 F1-series. The summary for this series is:
 Core:
 ARM Cortex-M4F core at a maximum clock rate of 72 MHz.
 Memory:
 Static RAM consists of 16 / 24 / 32 / 40 KB general purpose with hardware parity check, 0 / 8 KB core coupled memory (CCM) with hardware parity check, 64 / 128 bytes battery-backed with tamper-detection erase.
 Flash consists of 64 / 128 / 256 KB general purpose, 8 KB system boot, and option bytes.
 Each chip has a factory-programmed 96-bit unique device identifier number.
 Peripherals:
 Each F3-series includes various peripherals that vary from line to line.
 Oscillators consists of internal (8 MHz, 40 kHz), optional external (1 to 32 MHz, 32.768 to 1000 kHz).
 IC packages: LQFP48, LQFP64, LQFP100, UFBGA100.
 Operating voltage range is 2.0 to 3.6 volt.

The distinguishing feature for this series is presence of four fast, 12-bit, simultaneous sampling ADCs (multiplexer to over 30 channels), and four matched, 8 MHz bandwidth op-amps with all pins exposed and additionally internal PGA (Programmable Gain Array) network. The exposed pads allow for a range of analog signal conditioning circuits like band-pass filters, anti-alias filters, charge amplifiers, integrators/differentiators, 'instrumentation' high-gain differential inputs, and other. This eliminates need for external op-amps for many applications. The built-in two-channel DAC has arbitrary waveform as well as a hardware-generated waveform (sine, triangle, noise etc.) capability. All analog devices can be completely independent, or partially internally connected, meaning that one can have nearly everything that is needed for an advanced measurement and sensor interfacing system in a single chip.

The four ADCs can be simultaneously sampled making a wide range of precision analog control equipment possible. It is also possible to use a hardware scheduler for the multiplexer array, allowing good timing accuracy when sampling more than 4 channels, independent of the main processor thread. The sampling and multiplexing trigger can be controlled from a variety of sources including timers and built-in comparators, allowing for irregular sampling intervals where needed.

The op-amps inputs feature 2-to-1 analog multiplexer, allowing for a total of eight analog channels to be pre-processed using the op-amp; all the op-amp outputs can be internally connected to ADCs.

STM32 F4

The STM32 F4-series is the first group of STM32 microcontrollers based on the ARM Cortex-M4F core. The F4-series is also the first STM32 series to have DSP and floating-point instructions. The F4 is pin-to-pin compatible with the STM32 F2-series and adds higher clock speed, 64 KB CCM static RAM, full-duplex I²S, improved real-time clock, and faster ADCs. The summary for this series is:
 Core:
 ARM Cortex-M4F core at a maximum clock rate of 84 / 100 / 168 / 180 MHz.
 Memory:
 Static RAM consists of up to 192 KB general-purpose, 64 KB core-coupled memory (CCM), 4 KB battery-backed, 80 bytes battery-backed with tamper-detection erase.
 Flash consists of 512 / 1024 / 2048 KB general-purpose, 30 KB system boot, 512 bytes one-time programmable (OTP), 16 option bytes.
 Each chip has a factory-programmed 96-bit unique device identifier number.
 Peripherals:
 Common peripherals included in all IC packages are USB 2.0 OTG HS and FS, two CAN 2.0B, one SPI + two SPI or full-duplex I²S, three I²C, four USART, two UART, SDIO for SD/MMC cards, twelve 16-bit timers, two 32-bit timers, two watchdog timers, temperature sensor, 16 or 24 channels into three ADCs, two DACs, 51 to 140 GPIOs, sixteen DMA, improved real-time clock (RTC), cyclic redundancy check (CRC) engine, random number generator (RNG) engine. Larger IC packages add 8/16-bit external memory bus capabilities.
 The STM32F4x7 models add ethernet MAC and camera interface.
 The STM32F41x/43x models add a cryptographic processor for DES / TDES / AES, and a hash processor for SHA-1 and MD5.
 The STM32F4x9 models add a LCD-TFT controller.
 Oscillators consists of internal (16 MHz, 32 kHz), optional external (4 to 26 MHz, 32.768 to 1000 kHz).
 IC packages: WLCSP64, LQFP64, LQFP100, LQFP144, LQFP176, UFBGA176. STM32F429/439 also offers LQFP208 and UFBGA216.
 Operating voltage range is 1.8 to 3.6 volt.

STM32 F7

The STM32 F7-series is a group of STM32 microcontrollers based on the ARM Cortex-M7F core. Many of the F7 series are pin-to-pin compatible with the STM32 F4-series.

Core:
 ARM Cortex-M7F core at a maximum clock rate of 216 MHz.

STM32 G0

The STM32 G0-series is a next generation of Cortex-M0/M0+ microcontrollers for budget market segment, offering the golden mean in productivity and power efficiency, e.g. better power efficiency and performance compared to the older F0 series and higher performance compared to ultra low power L0 series
 Core:
 ARM Cortex-M0+ core at a maximum clock rate of 64 MHz.
 Debug interface is SWD with breakpoints and watchpoints. JTAG debugging isn't supported.
 Memory:
 Static RAM sizes of 8 to 128 KB general purpose with hardware parity checking and up to 144 KB without hardware parity checking,  5x 32-bit battery-backed registers with tamper-detection erase.
 Flash sizes of 16 to 512 KB.

STM32 G4

The STM32 G4-series is a next generation of Cortex-M4F microcontrollers aiming to replace F3 series, offering the golden mean in productivity and power efficiency, e.g. better power efficiency and performance compared to the older F3/F4 series and higher performance compared to ultra low power L4 series, integrated several hardware accelerators.
 Core:
 ARM Cortex-M4F core at a maximum clock rate of 170 MHz with FPU and DSP instructions
 Mathematical accelerators:
 CORDIC (trigonometric and hyperbolic functions)
 FMAC (filtering functions)
 Memory:
 Flash memory with error-correcting code (ECC) and sizes of 128 to 512 KB.
 Static RAM sizes of 32 to 128 KB with hardware parity checking and CCM-SRAM routine booster, 32x 32-bit battery-backed registers with tamper-detection erase.
 Rich advanced analog peripherals (comparator, op-amps, DAC)
 ADC with hardware oversampling (16-bit resolution) up to 4 Msps
 High-resolution timer version 2
 USB Type-C interface with Power Delivery including physical layer (PHY)
 Securable memory area
 AES hardware encryption

STM32 H7

The STM32 H7-series is a group of high performance STM32 microcontrollers based on the ARM Cortex-M7F core with double-precision floating point unit and optional second Cortex-M4F core with single-precision floating point. Cortex-M7F core can reach working frequency up to 480 MHz, while Cortex-M4F - up to 240 MHz. Each of these cores can work independently or as master/slave core.

The STM32H7 Series is the first series of STM32 microcontrollers in 40 nm process technology and the first series of ARM Cortex-M7-based microcontrollers which is able to run up to 480 MHz, allowing a performance boost versus previous series of Cortex-M microcontrollers, reaching new performance records of 1027 DMIPS and 2400 CoreMark.

STM32 L0

The STM32 L0-series is the first group of STM32 microcontrollers based on the ARM Cortex-M0+ core. This series targets low power applications. The summary for this series is:
 Core:
 ARM Cortex-M0+ core at a maximum clock rate of 32 MHz.
 Debug interface is SWD with breakpoints and watchpoints. JTAG debugging isn't supported.
 Memory:
 Static RAM sizes of 8 KB general purpose with hardware parity checking, 20 bytes battery-backed with tamper-detection erase.
 Flash sizes of 32 or 64 KB general purpose (with ECC).
 EEPROM sizes of 2 KB (with ECC).
 ROM which contains a boot loader with optional reprogramming of the flash from USART1, USART2, SPI1, SPI2.
 Each chip has a factory-programmed 96-bit unique device identifier number.
 Peripherals:
 two USART, one low-power UART, two I²C, two SPI or one I²S, one full-speed USB (only L0x2 and L0x3 chips).
 one 12-bit ADC with multiplexer, one 12-bit DAC, two analog comparators, temperature sensor.
 timers, low-power timers, watchdog timers, 5 V-tolerant GPIOs, real-time clock, DMA controller, CRC engine.
 capacitive touch sense and 32-bit random number generator (only L0x2 and L0x3 chips), LCD controller (only L0x3 chips), 128-bit AES engine (only L06x chips).
 Oscillators consists of optional external 1 to 24 MHz crystal or oscillator, optional external 32.768 kHz crystal or ceramic resonator, multiple internal oscillators, and one PLL.
 IC packages are LQFP48, LQFP64, TFBGA64.
 Operating voltage range is 1.8 to 3.6 volt, including a programmable brownout detector.

STM32 L1

The STM32 L1-series was the first group of STM32 microcontrollers with a primary goal of ultra-low power usage for battery-powered applications. The summary for this series is:
 Core:
 ARM Cortex-M3 core at a maximum clock rate of 32 MHz.
 Memory:
 Static RAM consists of 10 / 16 / 32 / 48 / 80 KB general purpose, 80 bytes with tamper-detection erase.
 Flash consists of 32 / 64 / 128 / 256 / 384 / 512 KB general purpose with ECC, 4 / 8 KB system boot, 32 option bytes, EEPROM consists of 4 / 8 / 12 / 16 KB data storage with ECC.
 Each chip has a factory-programmed 96-bit unique device identifier number.
 Peripherals:
 Common peripherals included in all IC packages are USB 2.0 FS, two SPI, two I²C, three USART, eight 16-bit timers, two watchdog timers, temperature sensor, 16 to 24 channels into one ADC, two DACs, 37 to 83 GPIOs, seven DMA, real-time clock (RTC), cyclic redundancy check (CRC) engine. The STM32FL152 line adds a LCD controller.
 Oscillators consists of internal (16 MHz, 38 kHz, variable 64 kHz to 4 MHz), optional external (1 to 26 MHz, 32.768 to 1000 kHz).
 IC packages: UFQFPN48, LQFP48, LQFP64, TFBGA64, LQFP100, UFBGA100.
 Operating voltage range is 1.65 to 3.6 volt.

STM32 L4

The STM32 L4-series is an evolution of STM32L1-series of ultra-low power microcontrollers. An example of L4 MCU is STM32L432KC in UFQFPN32 package, that has:
 ARM 32-bit Cortex-M4 core
 80 MHz max CPU frequency
 VDD from 1.65 V to 3.6 V
 256 KB Flash, 64 KB SRAM
 General purpose timers (4), SPI/I2S (2), I2C (2), USART (2), 12-bit ADC with 10 channels (1), GPIO (20) with external interrupt capability, RTC
 Random number generator (TRNG for HW entropy).

STM32 L4+

The STM32 L4+-series is expansion of STM32L4-series of ultra-low power microcontrollers, providing more performance, more embedded memory and richer graphics and connectivity features while keeping ultra-low-power capability.

Main features:
 ARM 32-bit Cortex-M4 core
 120 MHz max CPU frequency
 VDD from 1.71 V to 3.6 V
 Ultra low power consumption: down to 41 μA/MHz, 20 nA power consumption in power-down mode.
 Up to 2048 KB Flash, up to 640 KB SRAM
 Advanced peripherals, including TFT-LCD controller, Chrom-ART Accelerator, Camera interface etc.

STM32 L5

The STM32 L5-series is an evolution of STM32L-series of ultra-low power microcontrollers:
 ARM Cortex-M33 32-bit core
 110 MHz max CPU frequency

STM32 U5

The STM32 U5-series is an evolution of STM32L-series of ultra-low power microcontrollers:
 ARM Cortex-M33 32-bit core
 160 MHz max CPU frequency

Development boards

Arduino Nano style

The following boards have Arduino Nano pin-compatible male pin headers with 0.6-inch row-to-row DIP-30 footprint, but these boards have 3.3 volt logic I/O, instead of 5 volt logic I/O for an Arduino Nano.
 Blue Pill board has a STM32F103C8T6 microcontroller.  Unfortunately, most blue pill boards now contain a fake STM32 from China.
 Black Pill board has a STM32F401CCU6 or STM32F411CEU6 microcontroller.
 ST Nucleo-32 boards have Arduino Nano pin-compatible male pin headers too. (see Nucleo section below)

Arduino Uno style

The following boards have Arduino Uno pin-compatible female pin headers for Arduino shields, but these boards have 3.3 volt logic I/O, instead of 5 volt logic I/O for an Arduino Uno.
 Maple board by Leaflabs has a STM32F103RB microcontroller. A C/C++ library called libmaple is available to make it easier to migrate from Arduino.
 OLIMEXINO-STM32 board by Olimex has a STM32F103RBT6 microcontroller and similar to the Maple board.
 Netduino with support for .NET Micro Framework.
 ST Nucleo-64 and Nucleo-144 boards have female pin headers for Arduino shields too. (see Nucleo section below)

ST Nucleo
All Nucleo boards by STMicroelectronics support the mbed development environment, and have an additional onboard ST-LINK/V2-1 host adapter chip which supplies SWD debugging, virtual COM port, and mass storage over USB. There are three Nucleo board families, each supporting a different microcontroller IC package footprint.  The debugger embedded on Nucleo boards can be converted to the SEGGER J-Link debugger protocol.

 Nucleo-32 boards
 This family has 32-pin STM32 ICs and Arduino Nano pin-compatible male pin headers with 0.6-inch row-to-row DIP-30 footprint.
 Low power ICs are L011, L031, L412, L432. Mainstream ICs are F031, F042, F303, G031, G431. Mbed O/S is supported for F031, F042, F303, L011, L031, L432.
 NUCLEO-F031K6 board for STM32F031K6T6 MCU with 48 MHz Cortex-M0 core, 32 KB flash, 4 KB SRAM (HW parity).
 NUCLEO-F042K6 board for STM32F042K6T6 MCU with 48 MHz Cortex-M0 core, 32 KB flash, 6 KB SRAM (HW parity).
 NUCLEO-F301K8 board for STM32F301K8T6 MCU with 72 MHz Cortex-M4F core, 64 KB flash, 16 KB SRAM. (obsolete)
 NUCLEO-F303K8 board for STM32F303K8T6 MCU with 72 MHz Cortex-M4F core, 64 KB flash, 16 KB SRAM (HW parity).
 NUCLEO-G031K8 board for STM32G031K86U MCU with 64 MHz Cortex-M0+ core, 64 KB flash, 8 KB SRAM (HW parity).
 NUCLEO-G431KB board for STM32G431KB6U MCU with 170 MHz Cortex-M4F core, 128 KB flash (HW ECC), 16 KB SRAM (HW parity), 6 KB SRAM, 10 KB CCM SRAM, STLINK-V3E.
 NUCLEO-L011K4 board for STM32L011K4T6 MCU with 32 MHz Cortex-M0+ core, 16 KB flash (HW ECC), 2 KB SRAM, 0.5 KB EEPROM (HW ECC).
 NUCLEO-L031K6 board for STM32L031K6T6 MCU with 32 MHz Cortex-M0+ core, 32 KB flash (HW ECC), 8 KB SRAM, 1 KB EEPROM (HW ECC).
 NUCLEO-L412KB board for STM32L412KBU6 MCU with 80 MHz Cortex-M4F core, 128 KB flash (HW ECC), 32 KB SRAM, 8 KB SRAM (HW parity), external quad-SPI memory interface.
 NUCLEO-L432KC board for STM32L432KCU6 MCU with 80 MHz Cortex-M4F core, 256 KB flash (HW ECC), 48 KB SRAM, 16 KB SRAM (HW parity), external quad-SPI memory interface.

 Nucleo-64 boards

 This family has 64-pin STM32 ICs, Arduino Uno Rev3 female headers for shields, and ST Morpho male pin headers (two 19x2).
 Low power ICs are L053, L073, L152, L433, L452, L452, L476. Mainstream ICs are F030, F070, F072, F091, F103, F302, F303, F334, G070, G071, G0B1, G431, G474, G491. High performance ICs are F401, F410, F411, F446.
 NUCLEO-F030R8 board for STM32F030R8T6 MCU with 48 MHz Cortex-M0 core, 64 KB flash, 8 KB SRAM (HW parity).
 NUCLEO-F070RB board for STM32F070RBT6 MCU with 48 MHz Cortex-M0 core, 128 KB flash, 16 KB SRAM (HW parity).
 NUCLEO-F072RB board for STM32F072RBT6 MCU with 48 MHz Cortex-M0 core, 128 KB flash, 16 KB SRAM (HW parity).
 NUCLEO-F091RC board for STM32F091RCT6 MCU with 48 MHz Cortex-M0 core, 256 KB flash, 32 KB SRAM (HW parity).
 NUCLEO-F103RB board for STM32F103RBT6 MCU with 72 MHz Cortex-M3 core, 128 KB flash, 20 KB SRAM, external static memory interface.
 NUCLEO-F302R8 board for STM32F302R8T6 MCU with 72 MHz Cortex-M4F core, 64 KB flash, 16 KB SRAM.
 NUCLEO-F303RE board for STM32F303RET6 MCU with 72 MHz Cortex-M4F core, 512 KB flash, 32 KB SRAM, 48 KB SRAM (HW parity), external static memory interface.
 NUCLEO-F334R8 board for STM32F334R8T6 MCU with 72 MHz Cortex-M4F core, 64 KB flash, 16 KB SRAM (HW parity).
 NUCLEO-F401RE board for STM32F401RET6 MCU with 84 MHz Cortex-M4F core, 512 KB flash, 96 KB SRAM.
 NUCLEO-F410RB board for STM32F410RBT6 MCU with 100 MHz Cortex-M4F core, 128 KB flash, 32 KB SRAM.
 NUCLEO-F411RE board for STM32F411RET6 MCU with 100 MHz Cortex-M4F core, 512 KB flash, 128 KB SRAM.
 NUCLEO-F446RE board for STM32F446RET6 MCU with 180 MHz Cortex-M4F core, 512 KB flash, 128 KB SRAM, external quad-SPI memory interface, external flexible memory interface.
 NUCLEO-G070RB board for STM32G070RBT6 MCU with 64 MHz Cortex-M0+ core, 128 KB flash, 32 KB SRAM.
 NUCLEO-G071RB board for STM32G071RBT6 MCU with 64 MHz Cortex-M0+ core, 128 KB flash, 32 KB SRAM.
 NUCLEO-G0B1RE board for STM32G0B1RET6 MCU with 64 MHz Cortex-M0+ core, 512 KB flash, 128 KB SRAM.
 NUCLEO-G431RB board for STM32G431RBT6 MCU with 170 MHz Cortex-M4F core, 128 KB flash, 32 KB SRAM.
 NUCLEO-G474RE board for STM32G474RET6 MCU with 170 MHz Cortex-M4F core, 512 KB flash, 128 KB SRAM.
 NUCLEO-G491RE board for STM32G491RET6 MCU with 170 MHz Cortex-M4F core, 512 KB flash, 112 KB SRAM.
 NUCLEO-L053R8 board for STM32L053R8T6 MCU with 32 MHz Cortex-M0+ core, 64 KB flash (HW ECC), 8 KB SRAM, 2 KB EEPROM (HW ECC).
 NUCLEO-L073RZ board for STM32L073RZT6 MCU with 32 MHz Cortex-M0+ core, 192 KB flash (HW ECC), 20 KB SRAM, 6 KB EEPROM (HW ECC).
 NUCLEO-L152RE board for STM32L152RET6 MCU with 32 MHz Cortex-M3 core, 512 KB flash (HW ECC), 80 KB SRAM, 16 KB EEPROM (HW ECC).
 NUCLEO-L433RC-P board for STM32L433RCT6P MCU with 80 MHz Cortex-M4F core, 256 KB flash (HW ECC), 48 KB SRAM, 16 KB SRAM (HW parity), external quad-SPI memory interface, SMPS power.
 NUCLEO-L452RE-P board for STM32L452RET6P MCU with 80 MHz Cortex-M4F core, 512 KB flash (HW ECC), 128 KB SRAM, 32 KB SRAM (HW parity), external quad-SPI memory interface, SMPS power.
 NUCLEO-L452RE board for STM32L452RET6 MCU with 80 MHz Cortex-M4F core, 512 KB flash (HW ECC), 128 KB SRAM, 32 KB SRAM (HW parity), external quad-SPI memory interface.
 NUCLEO-L476RG board for STM32L476RGT6 MCU with 80 MHz Cortex-M4F core, 1024 KB flash (HW ECC), 96 KB SRAM, 32 KB SRAM (HW parity), external quad-SPI memory interface, external static memory interface.

 Nucleo-144 boards
 This family has 144-pin STM32 ICs, Arduino Uno Rev3 female headers for shields, ST Zio female headers, ST Morpho male pin headers (two 19x2), second Micro-AB USB connector, and RJ45 Ethernet connector (some boards).
 Low power ICs are L496, L496-P, L4A6, L4R5, L4R5-P. Mainstream IC is F303. High performance ICs are F207, F412, F413, F429, F439, F446, F722, F746, F756, F767, H743.
 NUCLEO-F207ZG board for STM32F207ZGT6 MCU with 120 MHz Cortex-M3 core, 1024 KB flash (HW ECC), 128 KB SRAM, 4 KB battery-back SRAM, external static memory interface, ethernet.
 NUCLEO-F303ZE board for STM32F303ZET6 MCU with 72 MHz Cortex-M4F core, 512 KB flash (HW ECC), 32 KB SRAM, 48 KB SRAM (HW parity), external static memory interface.
 NUCLEO-F412ZG board for STM32F412ZGT6 MCU with 100 MHz Cortex-M4F core, 1024 KB flash, 256 KB SRAM, external quad-SPI memory interface, external static memory interface.
 NUCLEO-F429ZI board for STM32F429ZIT6 MCU with 180 MHz Cortex-M4F core, 2048 KB flash, 256 KB SRAM, 4 KB battery-back SRAM, external flexible memory interface, ethernet.
 NUCLEO-F439ZI board for STM32F439ZIT6 MCU with 180 MHz Cortex-M4F core, 2048 KB flash, 256 KB SRAM, 4 KB battery-back SRAM, external flexible memory interface, ethernet, cryptographic acceleration.
 NUCLEO-F446ZE board for STM32F446ZET6 MCU with 180 MHz Cortex-M4F core, 512 KB flash, 128 KB SRAM, 4 KB battery-back SRAM, external quad-SPI memory interface, external flexible memory interface.
 NUCLEO-F746ZG board for STM32F746ZGT6 MCU with 216 MHz Cortex-M7F core (4 KB data cache, 4 KB instruction cache), 1024 KB flash, 336 KB SRAM, 4 KB battery-back SRAM, 1 KB OTP, external quad-SPI memory interface, external flexible memory interface, ethernet.
 NUCLEO-F767ZI board for STM32F767ZIT6 MCU with 216 MHz Cortex-M7F-DP core (16 KB data cache, 16 KB instruction cache), 2048 KB flash, 528 KB SRAM, 4 KB battery-back SRAM, external quad-SPI memory interface, external flexible memory interface, ethernet.
 Note: The unofficial suffix "-DP" means the ARM core includes double-precision floating point unit, where as all other chips are single-precision only.

ST Discovery
The following Discovery evaluation boards are sold by STMicroelectronics to provide a quick and easy way for engineers to evaluate their microcontroller chips. These kits are available from various distributors for less than US$20. The STMicroelectronics evaluation product licence agreement forbids their use in any production system or any product that is offered for sale.

Each board includes an on-board ST-LINK for programming and debugging via a Mini-B USB connector. The power for each board is provided by a choice of the 5 V via the USB cable, or an external 5 V power supply. They can be used as output power supplies of 3 V or 5 V (current must be less than 100 mA). All Discovery boards also include a voltage regulator, reset button, user button, multiple LEDs, SWD header on top of each board, and rows of header pins on the bottom.

An open-source project was created to allow Linux to communicate with the ST-LINK debugger.

ChibiOS/RT, a free RTOS, has been ported to run on some of the Discovery boards.

STM32L476GDISCOVERY
 A discovery board for STM32L476VGT6 microcontroller with 80 MHz ARM Cortex-M4F core, 1024 KB flash, 128 KB RAM in LQFP100 package

STM32F429IDISCOVERY
 A discovery board for STM32F429ZIT6 microcontroller with 180 MHz ARM Cortex-M4F core, 2048 KB flash, 256 KB RAM, 4 KB battery-backed RAM in LQFP144 package.
 This board includes an integrated ST-LINK/V2 debugger via Mini-B USB connector, 8 MB SDRAM (IS42S16400J), 2.4-inch 320x200 TFT LCD color display (SF-TC240T), touchscreen controller (STMPE811), gyroscope (L3GD20), 2 user LEDs, user button, reset button, Full-Speed USB OTG to second Micro-AB USB connector, and two 32x2 male pin headers.

STM32F4DISCOVERY

 A discovery board for STM32F407VGT6 microcontroller with 168 MHz ARM Cortex-M4F core, 1024 KB flash, 192 KB RAM, 4 KB battery-backed RAM in LQFP100 package.
 This board includes an integrated ST-LINK/V2 debugger via Mini-B USB connector, accelerometer (LIS302DL), microphone (MP45DT02), audio codec (CS43L22), 3.5 mm audio jack, 4 user LEDs, user button, reset button, Full-Speed USB OTG to second Micro-AB USB connector, and two 25x2 male pin headers.
 A separate STM32F4DIS-BB baseboard is available.

STM32F401CDISCOVERY
 A discovery board for STM32F401VCT6 microcontroller with 84 MHz ARM Cortex-M4F core, 256 KB flash, 64 KB RAM in LQFP100 package.
 This board includes an integrated ST-LINK/V2 debugger via Mini-B USB connector, accelerometer/compass (LSM303DLHC), gyroscope (L3GD20), microphone (MP45DT02), audio codec (CS43L22), 3.5 mm audio jack, 4 user LEDs, user button, reset button, Full-Speed USB OTG to second Micro-AB USB connector, and two 25x2 male pin headers.

STM32F3DISCOVERY
 A discovery board for STM32F303VCT6 microcontroller with 72 MHz ARM Cortex-M4F core, 256 KB flash, 48 KB RAM (24K with parity) in LQFP100 package.
 This board includes an integrated ST-LINK/V2 debugger via Mini-B USB connector, accelerometer/compass (LSM303DLHC), gyroscope (L3GD20), 8 user LEDs, user button, reset button, Full-Speed USB to second Mini-B USB connector, and two 25x2 male pin headers.

STM32VLDISCOVERY

 A discovery board for STM32F100RBT6 microcontroller with 24 MHz ARM Cortex-M3 core, 128 KB flash, 8 KB RAM in LQFP64 package.
 This board includes an integrated ST-LINK debugger via Mini-B USB connector, 2 user LEDs, user button, reset button, and two 28x1 male pin headers.

STM32L-DISCOVERY

 A discovery board for STM32L152RBT6 microcontroller with 32 MHz ARM Cortex-M3 core, 128 KB flash (with ECC), 16 KB RAM, 4 KB EEPROM (with ECC) in LQFP64 package.
 This board includes an integrated ST-LINK/V2 debugger via Mini-B USB connector, 24-segment LCD, touch sensors, 2 user LEDs, user button, reset button, and two 28x1 male pin headers.
 This board is currently End-Of-Life and replaced by the 32L152CDISCOVERY board.

STM32L152CDISCOVERY
 A discovery board for STM32L152RCT6 microcontroller with 32 MHz ARM Cortex-M3 core, 256 KB flash (with ECC), 32 KB RAM, 8 KB EEPROM (with ECC) in LQFP64 package.
 This board includes an integrated ST-LINK/V2 debugger via Mini-B USB connector, 24-segment LCD, touch sensors, 2 user LEDs, user button, reset button, and two 28x1 male pin headers.

STM32L100CDISCOVERY
 A discovery board for STM32L100RCT6 microcontroller with 32 MHz ARM Cortex-M3 core, 256 KB flash (with ECC), 16 KB RAM, 4 KB EEPROM (with ECC) in LQFP64 package.
 This board includes an integrated ST-LINK/V2 debugger via Mini-B USB connector, 2 user LEDs, user button, reset button, and two 33x1 male pin headers.

STM32F072BDISCOVERY
 A discovery board for STM32F072RBT6 microcontroller with 48 MHz ARM Cortex-M0 core, 128 KB flash, 16 KB RAM (with parity) in LQFP64 package.
 This board includes an integrated ST-LINK/V2 debugger via Mini-B USB connector, gyroscope (L3GD20), 4 user LEDs, user button, reset button, linear touch keys, Full-Speed USB to second Mini-B USB connector, and two 33x1 male pin headers.

STM32F0DISCOVERY
 A discovery board for STM32F051R8T6 microcontroller with 48 MHz ARM Cortex-M0 core, 64 KB flash, 8 KB RAM (with parity) in LQFP64 package.
 This board includes an integrated ST-LINK/V2 debugger via Mini-B USB connector, 2 user LEDs, user button, reset button, and two 33x1 male pin headers.
 A prototyping perfboard with 0.1-inch (2.54 mm) grid of holes is included.

STM32F0308DISCOVERY
 A discovery board for STM32F030R8T6 microcontroller with 48 MHz ARM Cortex-M0 core, 64 KB flash, 8 KB RAM (with parity) in LQFP64 package.
 This board includes an integrated ST-LINK/V2 debugger via Mini-B USB connector, 2 user LEDs, user button, reset button, and two 33x1 male pin headers.
 A prototyping perfboard with 0.1-inch (2.54 mm) grid of holes is included.

ST Evaluation
The following evaluation kits are sold by STMicroelectronics.

STM32W-RFCKIT
 An RF evaluation board for STM32 W-series.
 It contains two boards, each with a STM32W108 SoC microcontroller in VFQFPN40 and VFQFPN48 packages.
 The evaluation board has a built-in 2.4 GHz IEEE 802.15.4 transceiver and Lower MAC (so supports 802.15.4, ZigBee RF4CE, ZigBee Pro, 6LoWPAN (Contiki) wireless protocols). The SoC contains 128-Kbyte flash and 8-Kbyte RAM memory. Flash memory is upgradable too via USB. It has an ARM Serial Wire Debug (SWD) interface (Remote board) and is designed to be powered by USB or with 2 AAA batteries (Remote board). There are two user-defined LEDs (green and yellow) and five push buttons to create easy-to-use remote functions (remote board).

STM3220G-JAVA
A ready-to-use Java development kits for its STM32 microcontrollers. The STM3220G-JAVA Starter Kit combines an evaluation version of IS2T's MicroEJ Software Development Kit (SDK) and the STM32F2 series microcontroller evaluation board providing everything engineers need to start their projects.
MicroEJ provides extended features to create, simulate, test and deploy Java applications in embedded systems. Support for Graphical User Interface (GUI) development includes a widget library, design tools including storyboarding, and tools for customizing fonts. STM32 microcontrollers that embed Java have a Part Number that ends with J like STM32F205VGT6J.

Development tools

ARM Cortex-M

STM32
Design utilities
 Simulink, by MathWorks provides model-based design solutions to design embedded systems. The Embedded Coder Support Package for STMicroelectronics Discovery Boards and the Simulink Coder Support Package for STMicroelectronics Nucleo Boards provide parameter tuning, signal monitoring and one-click deployment of Simulink algorithms to STM32 boards with access to peripherals like ADC, PWM, GPIOs, I²C, SPI, SCI, TCP/IP, UDP, etc.

Flash programming via USART
All STM32 microcontrollers have a ROM'ed bootloader that supports loading a binary image into its flash memory using one or more peripherals (varies by STM32 family). Since all STM32 bootloaders support loading from the USART peripheral and most boards connect the USART to RS-232 or a USB-to-UART adapter IC, thus it's a universal method to program the STM32 microcontroller. This method requires the target to have a way to enable/disable booting from the ROM'ed bootloader (i.e. jumper / switch / button).

STM32CubeMX
 Tool for selecting, initializing and configuring STM32 products (link).

STM32CubeIDE
 Eclipse Java based IDE for STM32 products (link)

STM32CubeProgrammer
 Tool for programming STM32 products (link)
 Replaces STM32 ST-Link Utility (STSW-LINK004)

STM32 C/C++ software libraries
 HAL (Hardware Abstraction Layer) Drivers
 LL (Low Layer) Drivers
 Standard peripheral library (deprecated)
 embOS
 FreeRTOS
 USB device library.
 DSP library.
 Encryption library.
 Motor control library.
 MP3 / WMA / Speex codecs and audio engine.
 Self-test routines.

Documentation
The amount of documentation for all ARM chips can be daunting, especially for newcomers. As microprocessors have increased in capability and complexity, the documentation has grown. The total documentation for all ARM chips consists of documents from the IC manufacturer (STMicroelectronics) and documents from CPU core vendor (ARM Holdings).

A typical top-down documentation tree is: manufacturer website, manufacturer marketing slides, manufacturer datasheet for the exact physical chip, manufacturer detailed reference manual that describes common peripherals and aspects of a physical chip family, ARM core generic user guide, ARM core technical reference manual, ARM architecture reference manual that describes the instruction set(s).

STM32 documentation tree (top to bottom)
 STM32 website.
 STM32 marketing slides.
 STM32 datasheet.
 STM32 reference manual.
 ARM core website.
 ARM core generic user guide.
 ARM core technical reference manual.
 ARM architecture reference manual.

STMicroelectronics has additional documents, such as: evaluation board user manuals, application notes, getting started guides, software library documents, errata, and more. See External Links section for links to official STM32 and ARM documents.

Part number decoding

Example:
 STM32F407VG, split into STM32 F4 07 V G, means: F4 series, 07 subtype, 100 pin, 1024 KB flash

Decoding:
 STM32 xx ww y z
 xx – Series family
 ww – Subtype, differs by each series family
 y – Package pin count
 z – Flash memory size

See also

 ARM architecture, List of ARM microprocessor cores, ARM Cortex-M
 Microcontroller, List of common microcontrollers
 Embedded system, Single-board microcontroller
 Interrupt, Interrupt handler, Comparison of real-time operating systems

References

Further reading

 The Insider's Guide To The STM32 ARM Based Microcontroller; 2nd Edition (v1.8); Trevor Martin; Hitex; 96 pages; 2009; . (Download) (Other Guides)
 µC/OS-III: The Real-Time Kernel for the STMicroelecronics STM32F107; 1st Edition; Jean Labrosse; Micrium; 820 pages; 2009; .
 µC/TCP-IP: The Embedded Protocol Stack for the STMicroelectronics STM32F107; 1st Edition; Christian Légaré; Micrium; 824 pages; 2010; .

External links

STM32 Official Documents
 
{| class="wikitable"
|-
! STM32Series !! STM32Website !! STM32Slides !! STM32Reference !! ARMCPU Core
|-
| style="background: LightCyan" |  C0  ||  Link  ||    ||    ||  Cortex-M0+ 
|-
| style="background: LightCyan" |  F0  ||  Link  ||    ||  F0x1/2/8,F030  ||  Cortex-M0 
|-
| style="background: LightCyan" |  F1  ||  Link  ||   ||  F101/2/3/5/7F100  ||  Cortex-M3
|-
| style="background: LightCyan" |  F2  ||  Link  ||   ||  F20x / F21x  ||  Cortex-M3
|-
| style="background: LightCyan" |  F3  ||  Link  ||    ||  F37x / F38x,F30x / F31x  ||  Cortex-M4F
|-
| style="background: LightCyan" |  F4  ||  Link  ||    ||  F4x5/7/9,F401  ||  Cortex-M4F
|-
| style="background: LightCyan" |  F7  ||  Link  ||    ||    ||  Cortex-M7F
|-
| style="background: LightCyan" |  G0  ||  Link  ||    ||    ||  Cortex-M0+ 
|-
| style="background: LightCyan" |  G4  ||  Link  ||    ||    ||  Cortex-M4F 
|-
| style="background: LightCyan" |  H5  ||  Link  ||    ||    
|Cortex-M33F 
|-
| style="background: LightCyan" |  H7  ||  Link  ||    ||    ||  Cortex-M7F, Cortex-M4F
|-
| style="background: LightCyan" |  L0  ||  Link  ||    ||  L0xx  ||  Cortex-M0+ 
|-
| style="background: LightCyan" |  L1  ||  Link  ||   ||  L1xx  ||  Cortex-M3 
|-
| style="background: LightCyan" |  L4  ||  Link  ||    ||    ||  Cortex-M4F 
|-
| style="background: LightCyan" |  L4+  ||  Link  ||    ||    ||  Cortex-M4F 
|-
| style="background: LightCyan" |  L5  ||  Link  ||    ||    ||  Cortex-M33F 
|-
| style="background: LightCyan" |  U5  ||  Link  ||    ||    
|Cortex-M33F 
|-
| style="background: LightCyan" |  WBA  ||  Link  ||    ||    
|Cortex-M33F 
|-
| style="background: LightCyan" |  WB  ||  Link  ||    ||    ||  Cortex-M4F, Cortex-M0+ 
|-
| style="background: LightCyan" |  WL  ||  Link  ||    ||    ||  Cortex-M4, Cortex-M0+ 
|}

ARM Official Documents

Other
 Official ST Community: STM32 MCUs
 STMicroelectronics GitHub: GitHub
 STM32 Communities: Primer
 STM32 USART bus: Article 1, Article 2, Article 3
 STM32 SPI bus: Article 1
 STM32 ADC: Article 1
 STM32 Bit Band Memory: Article 1
 Libraries: ARM CMSIS, libopencm3

ARM-based microcontrollers